The Depoe Bay Bridge is one of a series of significant bridges along the Oregon Coast Highway. The bridge's designer was Conde McCullough who designed all of the 1920s bridges on the highway. The added structure is sympathetic to the original and is included in the National Register of Historic Places listing.

Description

The bridge spans the narrow outlet of Depoe Bay with one long arch and three arched girders on one approach side, with a smaller arched girder on the other side. The bridge was built by the Kuckenberg-Wittman Company for $55,000. The deck features a decorative arched railing with details in the Art Moderne style popular at the time. The 1940 bridge joins the original bridge to create a  roadway with  sidewalks on either side. The new span was built by the Odom Construction Company and incorporates stairs and a walkway under the bridge for access to the Depoe Bay Whale Watching Center.

The Depoe Bay Bridge was placed on the National Register of Historic Places on August 5, 2005.

See also
List of bridges documented by the Historic American Engineering Record in Oregon
List of bridges on the National Register of Historic Places in Oregon
National Register of Historic Places listings in Lincoln County, Oregon

References

External links

Road bridges on the National Register of Historic Places in Oregon
Bridges completed in 1927
Bridges in Lincoln County, Oregon
Public Works Administration in Oregon
Open-spandrel deck arch bridges in the United States
Bridges by Conde McCullough
Historic American Engineering Record in Oregon
National Register of Historic Places in Lincoln County, Oregon
1927 establishments in Oregon
Concrete bridges in the United States